Paradise Township is a township in Russell County, Kansas, United States. As of the 2010 United States Census, it had a population of 166.

Geography
The center of Paradise Township is located at  (38.0541780, −98.9253637) at an elevation of 1,827 feet (557 m). The township lies in the Smoky Hills region of the Great Plains. The Saline River flows windingly southeast through the southern half of the township. One of its tributaries, Paradise Creek, runs southeast through the northeastern part of the township.

According to the United States Census Bureau, Paradise Township has an area of 143.91 square miles (372.7 km) of which 143.68 square miles (372.1 km) is land and 0.23 square miles (0.6 km) is water. Forming the northwest corner of Russell County, it includes the city of Paradise, located in the north-central part of the township, as well as the unincorporated community of Fairport, located at the midpoint of the township's western border. It borders Osborne County's Natoma, Liberty, and Valley Townships to the north, Waldo Township to the east, Russell and Big Creek Townships to the south, and Ellis County's Herzog Township to the west.

Demographics

As of the 2010 census, there were 166 people, 77 households, and 51 families residing in the township. The population density was 1.2 people per square mile (0.4/km). There were 99 housing units at an average density of 0.7 per square mile (0.3/km). The racial makeup of the township was 95.8% White, 1.8% Native American, 0.6% from some other race, and 1.8% from two or more races. Hispanic or Latino of any race were 2.4% of the population.

There were 77 households, out of which 24.7% had children under the age of 18 living with them, 62.3% were married couples living together, 1.3% had a male householder with no wife present, 2.6% had a female householder with no husband present, and 33.8% were non-families. 28.6% of all households were made up of individuals, and 16.9% had someone living alone who was 65 years of age or older. The average household size was 2.16, and the average family size was 2.63.

In the township, the population was spread out, with 21.1% under the age of 18, 2.0% from 18 to 24, 18.6% from 25 to 44, 28.8% from 45 to 64, and 29.5% who were 65 years of age or older. The median age was 50 years. For every 100 females, there were 97.6 males. For every 100 females age 18 and over, there were 92.7 males age 18 and over.

Education
The majority of the township lies within Unified School District (USD) 399, based in Natoma. Parts of southern Paradise Township lie in USD 407, based in Russell.

Transportation
U.S. Route 281 runs north-south through the eastern part of Paradise Township to its junction with Kansas Highway 18 (K-18), an east-west route, one mile south of the Osborne County line. East of that junction, the two highways run concurrently east-west. K-18 enters the township from the north, running southeast, and turns east at the city of Paradise. A network of mostly unpaved county roads is laid out in a grid pattern across the township. Segments of two of these roads are paved:  Gorham-Fairport Road, which runs north-south through the southwestern part of the township and both turns west and becomes unpaved roughly a mile east of Fairport, and Paradise Road, which zigzags south and west from the city of Paradise.

References

Townships in Russell County, Kansas
Townships in Kansas